Eupithecia malchoensis is a moth in the family Geometridae. It is found in the regions of Maule (Linares Province) and Biobio (Nuble Province) in Chile. The habitat consists of the Central Valley Biotic Province.

The length of the forewings is about 8.5 mm for males and 10 mm for females. The forewings are brown, with greyish brown and reddish brown scaling. The hindwings are pale greyish white anteriorly, with grey and blackish brown scales posteriorly. Adults have been recorded on wing in November and December.

Etymology
The specific name is based on the type locality.

References

Moths described in 1987
malchoensis
Moths of South America
Endemic fauna of Chile